Faunce is a surname. Notable people with the name include:

Benjamin Faunce (1873–1949), American druggist and businessman
Daniel Faunce (1829–1911), American minister and writer
Ev Faunce (1926–2009), American football player and coach
Jennifer Faunce (born 1965), American politician and judge
Marcus de Laune Faunce (1922–2004), Australian physician
Thomas Faunce (1958–2019), Australian bioethicist and researcher
Thomas Faunce (cricketer) (1883–1968), Australian cricketer
William Faunce (1859–1930), American clergyman and educator

See also
Faunt (surname)